Tremont Music Hall was a music venue located near downtown Charlotte, North Carolina. The name is based on its address 400 West Tremont Ave.  Most shows were all-ages, but the venue had a full-service bar that served beer and liquor.  The venue opened in 1995, and became one of the premier venues for independent/metal/alternative bands in the Southeast.  It closed on December 19, 2015.

Main Hall
Tremont Music Hall's Main Hall is located on the North Side of the building.  The Main Hall is used for larger/national touring acts, featuring a PA/monitor and light system.  Two full sized dressing rooms are available for the performers of the main room.  There is a regulation height loading dock on the stage left or better defined as on the rear of House Right FOH. This loading dock is on the same level with the audience's non raked floor, Creating a short and straight path to all areas needed for load in and/or load out. There is convenient parking with sufficient room to maneuver for tour buses both band and crew buses and semi trailers  by the loading dock and rear stage door. While this outside parking is close to the main stage, it however lacks any shore power electrical tie in boxes near the bus and truck parking. This leaves tours with options of carrying or renting from local sources to supplement their touring gear. Power is needed for climate control, lighting, refrigerators and other appliances. The additional amounts of larger gauge wire to compensate from voltage and amp loss causes it to be a lesser preferred option for the extra costs and hassles (picking up and returning to local rental company or the additional costs of delivery and retrieval by the rental company). More commonly the running of a diesel or another fuel source like gasoline driven generator, with the most common type being the diesel generator,  can create noise, smell, pollution issues and/or exhaust that may make people feel ill and is not healthy to breathe. There are no facility connections to dispose of grey water or sewage from the buses.

The Main Hall's room stage's dimensions are 19'x24'x3' with an 8'X8'X18" (8 feet for length and width and a height off the ground of 18 inches)  drummer's platform upstage that can be relocated and/or removed when necessary.  Past performers of the main room include Medeski, Martin, and Wood, Blues Traveler, Ween, Leftover Salmon, Jonathan Davis, Green Day, Superdrag, Guster, Jump Little Children, Gregg Allman and Friends, Ben Folds, Gov't Mule, Disco Biscuits, O.A.R., New Earth Mud, Hopesfall, GWAR, The Misfits, Young Buck, Iggy Pop, Henry Rollins, Minus the Bear, Cursive, Nickelback, Fugazi, Ministry, The English Beat, David Allan Coe, X, Cluch, Whitechapel, Fall Out Boy, New Found Glory, Megadeth, W.A.S.P., Skid Row, Elliot Smith, Nelly Furtado, Good Charlotte, Rancid, Agnostic Front, Hatebreed, Buju Banton, Beanie Man, Jerry Cantrell, Fugazi, Decendents, Less Than Jake, Madball, Insane Clown Posse, Reakwon, Ghostface Killa, Between the Buried and Me, Boysetsfire, Norma Jean, Killswitch Engage, Ministry, KMFDM, The Electric Hellfire Club, Current 93, Death in June Celtic Frost, Isis, Napalm Death, Puddle of Mudd, Mest, Cowboy Mouth,Anthrax,Primus, Danzig, P.O.D. and many many others. The prior bookings have included performers who went on to become major national and intentional acts, along with performers who faded into obscurity. Tremont Music Hall has given many local acts a chance and a venue at which to perform. In addition the production staff, stagehands, audio engineers, lighting designers and light board operators/programmers who have advance in careers into larger venues and touring as roadies for bands.

The Casbah
The Casbah is a smaller stage located against the southern wall of the building closer to the bar.  The Casbah is used several nights a week for smaller, local and regional shows as well as dance parties and club events.  Typical bills have 3-4 bands, with doors at 7, show at 8.  The Casbah sports the main room's old FOH sound board, and a recently updated monitor system.  There is now a dedicated, but limited lighting system, including club lighting on the floor.  The stage area and floor have received a facelift and renovation in 2005 and again in 2009.  This increased the size of the stage and updated the infrastructure of this space to accommodate larger shows and audiences.  Past performers of the Casbah include Tom Morello (The Nightwatchman), Hopesfall, Mojo Nixon, The Dismemberment Plan, My Chemical Romance, Creed, moe., One Six Conspiracy, Scapegoat, Fliptrick, Swift, Beloved, 37 Including You, Near the Never, Blitzen Trapper, Cursive, Autolux, Evan Dando, Deicide, Faster Pussycat, Trashcan Sinatras, Agent Orange, GBH, The Adicts, Street Dogs, Cute Is What We Aim For, Cobra Starship, MGMT, Of Montreal, Torche, She Wants Revenge, Against Me!, Sick of it all, The Casualties, Avail, Converge, 18 Visions, Agnostic Front, Snapcase, Earth Crisis, The Murder Junkies, As I Lay dying, DSR, Hopesfall. Antiseen, Minus the Bear, Chevelle, Trapt, 36 Crazy Fist, Our Lady Peace, Hot Water Music, LandScapeGoat, Watch Husky Burn, and others.

The Casbah also featured some arcade machines, a pinball machine (Whirlwind) that Gabe, Phil, Jay, and Tim used to destroy on a regular basis, and a table and nails in the wall for merchandise.

Shows are not limited to just the two stages and their respective rooms. The parking lot and a since removed 3 sided and roofed shed have hosted performances that the inside spaces were not the best option for.

References

External links
 https://www.facebook.com/tremontmusichall Facebook Page

Buildings and structures in Charlotte, North Carolina
Music venues in North Carolina
Tourist attractions in Charlotte, North Carolina